The Horticulture, Agriculture and Forestry Union (GGLF) was a West German trade union representing agricultural and forestry workers.

The union was founded in July 1949, and was a founding member of the German Trade Union Confederation (DGB) in October of that same year.  In 1995 the GGLF claimed 90,281 members and in 1996 the union merged with the Building and Construction Union to form IG Bauen-Agrar-Umwelt (IG BAU).

Presidents
1949: Friedrich Greve
1956: Heinz Frehsee
1959: Hellmut Schmalz
1968: Alfons Lappas
1969: Alois Pfeiffer
1975: Willi Lojewski
1987: Günther Lappas
1993: Hans-Joachim Wilms

References

Agriculture and forestry trade unions
German Trade Union Confederation
Trade unions established in 1949
Trade unions disestablished in 1996